Munster is an unincorporated community in LaSalle and Livingston counties, in the U.S. state of Illinois.

History
The community was perhaps named after Munster, in Ireland.

References

Unincorporated communities in LaSalle County, Illinois
Unincorporated communities in Livingston County, Illinois
Unincorporated communities in Illinois